The 1999 TSFL (Tasmanian State Football League) premiership season was an Australian rules football competition, staged across Tasmania, Australia over eighteen roster rounds and four finals series matches between 10 April and 18 September 1999.
This was the fourteenth season of statewide football and the League was known as the Chickenfeed Super League under a commercial naming-rights sponsorship agreement with Chickenfeed Bargain Stores in Hobart worth A$350,000.

From this season the competition would be under the control of a new independent governing body of the sport in Tasmania named Football Tasmania as part of recommendations set down by the Australian Football League's Biggs Report investigation into the strong decline in interest and financial disarray of the TFL competition.
In December 1998 Football Tasmania was formed and in February 1999 the Tasmanian Football League was liquidated and the new governing body assumed control of the competition.
From this season North Hobart were rebranded as the Hobart Demons under a marketing arrangement with their major sponsor Harris Scarfe (formerly FitzGerald's)  whilst New Norfolk were rebranded as the Derwent Eagles to reflect their entire region (Derwent Valley).
On 31 May, Southern Districts folded after just eighteen months due to ongoing financial difficulties and falling support whilst Derwent Eagles (New Norfolk) were excluded from the competition after this season for both financial and geographical reasons, they were paid a sum of money to leave the TSFL by Football Tasmania and joined the SFL the following season.

Participating Clubs
Burnie Dockers Football Club
Clarence District Football Club
Devonport Power Football Club
Glenorchy District Football Club
Derwent Eagles Football Club
Hobart Demons Football Club
Northern Bombers Football Club
Southern Districts Football Club (Disbanded on 31 May 1999)

1999 TSFL Club Coaches
Darren Winter (Burnie Dockers)
Dean Chiron (Clarence)
Richard Spencer (Devonport Power)
Paul Hamilton (Glenorchy)
Andrew Dale (Derwent Eagles)
Darryn Perry (Hobart Demons)
Rod Hill (Northern Bombers)
Troy Clarke (Southern Districts)

TSFL Reserves Grand Final
Burnie Dockers 11.19 (85) v Northern Bombers 10.9 (69) – North Hobart Oval

TSFL Under-19's Grand Final
Clarence 10.13 (73) v Devonport Power 5.6 (36) – North Hobart Oval

Interstate Matches
Interstate Match (Saturday, 19 June 1999)
Western Australia 20.12 (132) v Tasmania 10.14 (74) – Att: 7,000 at Sir Richard Moore Sports Centre, Kalgoorlie

Leading Goalkickers: TFL Statewide League
Adam Aherne (Northern Bombers) – 67
Scott Allen (Clarence) – 51
Mark Colegrave (Clarence) – 47
Steane Kremerskothen (Northern Bombers) – 41

Medal Winners
Ben Atkin (Glenorchy), Matthew Jones (Clarence) & Darren Trevena (Northern Bombers) – William Leitch Medal
Ben Careless (Glenorchy) – Darrel Baldock Medal (Best player in TFL Grand Final)
Stuart Beechey (Clarence) – George Watt Medal (Reserves)
Jason Rigby (Hobart Demons) – V.A Geard Medal (Under-19's)

1999 TSFL Ladder

1 Southern Districts were wound up at a Football Tasmania meeting on 31 May and their record (2W 6L 0D 820 For 890 Against 92.13% Points 8) was expunged; each team that had already played them and those teams who had been drawn to play them for the rest of the season were awarded four premiership points.

Round 1
(Saturday, 10 April 1999)
Burnie Dockers 16.10 (106) v Glenorchy 14.10 (94) – Att: 1,043 at KGV Football Park
Derwent Eagles 17.9 (111) v Hobart Demons 13.15 (93) – Att: 1,087 at Boyer Oval
Clarence 16.15 (111) v Northern Bombers 14.6 (90) – Att: 1,304 at York Park
Southern Districts 26.23 (179) v Devonport 7.9 (51) – Att: 773 at Devonport Oval

Round 2
(Saturday, 17 April & Sunday, 18 April 1999)
Clarence 19.14 (128) v Derwent Eagles 9.11 (65) – Att: 1,258 at Bellerive Oval
Northern Bombers 24.20 (164) v Devonport 6.6 (42) – Att: 802 at Devonport Oval
Burnie Dockers 16.17 (113) v Hobart Demons 10.13 (73) – Att: 1,159 at West Park Oval
Glenorchy 22.17 (149) v Southern Districts 12.15 (87) – Att: 1,458 at Huonville Recreation Ground (Sunday)

Round 3
(Saturday, 24 April & Sunday, 25 April 1999)
Glenorchy 23.12 (150) v Hobart Demons 14.12 (96) – Att: 1,353 at North Hobart Oval
Clarence 27.23 (185) v Devonport 2.8 (20) – Att: 762 at Bellerive Oval
Northern Bombers 10.11 (71) v Burnie Dockers 9.10 (64) – Att: 1,137 at York Park
Derwent Eagles 17.18 (120) v Southern Districts 15.11 (101) – Att: 858 at Huonville Recreation Ground (Sunday)

Round 4
(Saturday, 1 May 1999)
Hobart Demons 15.16 (106) v Southern Districts 15.8 (98) – Att: 850 at North Hobart Oval
Clarence 16.14 (110) v Glenorchy 9.10 (64) – Att: 1,367 at KGV Football Park
Northern Bombers 20.11 (131) v Derwent Eagles 8.7 (55) – Att: 933 at Boyer Oval
Burnie Dockers 21.19 (145) v Devonport 5.8 (38) – Att: 1,900 at West Park Oval

Round 5
(Saturday, 8 May 1999)
Burnie Dockers 10.13 (73) v Southern Districts 8.11 (59) – Att: 691 at North Hobart Oval
Clarence 14.16 (100) v Hobart Demons 10.6 (66) – Att: 1,066 at Bellerive Oval
Northern Bombers 21.16 (142) v Glenorchy 8.12 (60) – Att: 806 at York Park
Devonport 16.11 (107) v Derwent Eagles 9.13 (67) – Att: 712 at Devonport Oval

Round 6
(Saturday, 15 May & Sunday, 16 May 1999)
Northern Bombers 17.12 (114) v Hobart Demons 6.9 (45) – Att: 757 at North Hobart Oval
Glenorchy 26.25 (181) v Devonport 6.5 (41) – Att: 974 at KGV Football Park
Derwent Eagles 12.10 (82) v Burnie Dockers 10.12 (72) – Att: 933 at West Park Oval
Clarence 22.14 (146) v Southern Districts 11.12 (78) – Att: 866 at North Hobart Oval (Sunday)

Round 7
(Saturday, 22 May & Sunday, 23 May 1999)
Clarence 23.9 (147) v Burnie Dockers 12.10 (82) – Att: 1,064 at Bellerive Oval
Glenorchy 17.16 (118) v Derwent Eagles 7.9 (51) – Att: 1,145 at Boyer Oval
Hobart Demons 26.25 (181) v Devonport 3.4 (22) – Att: 738 at Devonport Oval
Northern Bombers 23.23 (161) v Southern Districts 6.3 (39) – Att: 872 at York Park (Sunday)

Round 8
(Saturday, 29 May & Sunday, 30 May 1999)
Southern Districts 27.17 (179) v Devonport 13.6 (84) – Att: 447 at North Hobart Oval 
Northern Bombers 18.13 (121) v Clarence 12.7 (79) – Att: 3,534 at Bellerive Oval
Glenorchy 7.6 (48) v Burnie Dockers 6.7 (43) – Att: 547 at West Park Oval
Hobart Demons 17.10 (112) v Derwent Eagles 10.18 (78) – Att: 1,195 at North Hobart Oval (Sunday)

Round 9
(Saturday, 5 June & Sunday, 6 June 1999)
Burnie Dockers 11.15 (81) v Hobart Demons 10.7 (67) – Att: 917 at North Hobart Oval
Clarence 17.9 (111) v Derwent Eagles 12.8 (80) – Att: 851 at Boyer Oval
Northern Bombers 31.22 (208) v Devonport 3.5 (23) – Att: 600 at York Park (Sunday)
Bye: Glenorchy (Four premiership points awarded).

Round 10
(Saturday, 12 June & Sunday, 13 June 1999)
Glenorchy 22.13 (145) v Hobart Demons 11.15 (81) – Att: 1,024 at KGV Football Park
Clarence 30.15 (195) v Devonport 6.2 (38) – Att: 698 at Devonport Oval
Burnie Dockers 12.6 (78) v Northern Bombers 8.11 (59) – Att: 1,137 at West Park Oval (Sunday)
Bye: Derwent Eagles (Four premiership points awarded).

Round 11
(Saturday, 26 June & Sunday, 27 June 1999)
Clarence 11.10 (76) v Glenorchy 7.10 (52) – Att: 1,233 at Bellerive Oval
Northern Bombers 29.16 (190) v Derwent Eagles 11.7 (73) – Att: 987 at York Park
Burnie Dockers 33.14 (212) v Devonport 5.7 (37) – Att: 1,327 at Devonport Oval (Sunday)
Bye: Hobart Demons (Four premiership points awarded).

Round 12
(Saturday, 3 July & Sunday, 4 July 1999)
Northern Bombers 10.10 (70) v Glenorchy 7.6 (48) – Att: 865 at KGV Football Park
Derwent Eagles 26.17 (173) v Devonport 14.7 (91) – Att: 677 at Boyer Oval
Clarence 15.11 (101) v Hobart Demons 8.4 (52) – Att: 1,254 at North Hobart Oval (Sunday)
Bye: Burnie Dockers (Four premiership points awarded).

Round 13
(Saturday, 10 July 1999)
Derwent Eagles 25.6 (156) v Burnie Dockers 17.11 (113) – Att: 735 at Boyer Oval
Northern Bombers 29.12 (186) v Hobart Demons 10.10 (70) – Att: 1,018 at York Park
Glenorchy 28.18 (186) v Devonport 5.9 (39) – Att: 675 at Devonport Oval (Sunday)
Bye: Clarence (Four premiership points awarded).

Round 14
(Saturday, 17 July 1999)
Hobart Demons 23.20 (158) v Devonport 4.8 (32) – Att: 529 at North Hobart Oval
Glenorchy 19.7 (121) v Derwent Eagles 13.14 (92) – Att: 1,176 at KGV Football Park
Clarence 18.8 (116) v Burnie Dockers 8.13 (61) – Att: 1,009 at West Park Oval
Bye: Northern Bombers (Four premiership points awarded).

Round 15
(Saturday, 24 July & Saturday, 31 July 1999)
Hobart Demons 10.16 (76) v Derwent Eagles 10.13 (73) – Att: 848 at Boyer Oval (24 July)
Northern Bombers 14.9 (93) v Clarence 14.8 (92) – Att: 2,740 at York Park (24 July)
Glenorchy 11.12 (78) v Burnie Dockers 8.10 (58) – Att: 1,130 at KGV Football Park (31 July)
Bye: Devonport (Four premiership points awarded).

Round 16
(Saturday, 7 August & Sunday, 8 August 1999)
Clarence 19.17 (131) v Derwent Eagles 9.10 (64) – Att: 1,233 at Bellerive Oval
Burnie Dockers 13.12 (90) v Hobart Demons 9.12 (66) – Att: 1,052 at West Park Oval
Northern Bombers 9.17 (71) v Devonport 3.2 (20) – Att: 585 at Devonport Oval (Sunday)
Bye: Glenorchy (Four premiership points awarded).

Round 17
(Saturday, 14 August 1999)
Glenorchy 19.18 (132) v Hobart Demons 4.10 (34) – Att: 1,071 at North Hobart Oval
Clarence 38.16 (244) v Devonport 4.4 (28) – Att: 502 at Bellerive Oval *
Northern Bombers 13.24 (102) v Burnie Dockers 5.5 (35) – Att: 1,504 at York Park
Bye: Derwent Eagles (Four premiership points awarded).
Note: Clarence Football Club kick their club record TFL score.

Round 18
(Friday, 20 August & Saturday, 21 August 1999)
Burnie Dockers 13.14 (92) v Devonport 9.8 (62) – Att: 1,598 at West Park Oval (Friday Night)
Glenorchy 19.11 (125) v Clarence 17.10 (112) – Att: 1,312 at KGV Football Park
Northern Bombers 24.12 (156) v Derwent Eagles 11.9 (75) – Att: 798 at Boyer Oval *
Bye: Hobart Demons (Four premiership points awarded).
Note: The New Norfolk/Derwent Eagles' final TFL match and the final TFL match at Boyer Oval.

Qualifying Final
(Saturday, 28 August 1999)
Glenorchy: 10.1 (61) | 14.4 (88) | 16.10 (106) | 22.14 (146)
Clarence: 0.2 (2) | 5.5 (35) | 6.10 (46) | 11.12 (78)
Attendance: 2,635 at North Hobart Oval

Elimination Final
(Sunday, 29 August 1999)
Burnie Dockers: 1.4 (10) | 3.9 (27) | 8.12 (60) | 8.13 (61)
Hobart Demons: 4.2 (26) | 5.3 (33) | 6.4 (40) | 8.6 (54)
Attendance: 1,566 at Devonport Oval

Second Semi Final
(Saturday, 4 September 1999)
Glenorchy Magpies: 4.1 (25) | 5.1 (31) | 5.3 (33) | 5.3 (33)
Northern Bombers: 1.0 (6) | 1.3 (9) | 3.6 (24) | 3.8 (26)
Attendance: 1,702 at York Park

First Semi Final
(Sunday, 5 September 1999)
Clarence Roos: 5.2 (32) | 10.5 (65) | 10.7 (67) | 10.8 (68)
Burnie Dockers: 1.4 (10) | 1.6 (12) | 4.10 (34) | 7.11 (53)
Attendance: 1,254 at North Hobart Oval

Preliminary Final
(Sunday, 12 September 1999)
Northern Bombers: 1.5 (11) | 4.5 (29) | 8.6 (54) | 12.16 (88)
Clarence Roos: 4.2 (26) | 8.6 (54) | 11.8 (74) | 13.8 (86)
Attendance: 2,791 at North Hobart Oval

Grand Final
(Saturday, 18 September 1999) (ABC-TV highlights: 1999 TSFL Grand Final)
Glenorchy Magpies: 4.3 (27) | 6.5 (41) | 10.7 (67) | 15.9 (99)
Northern Bombers: 3.5 (23) | 4.6 (30) | 6.9 (45) | 7.11 (53)
Attendance: 8,053 at North Hobart Oval

Source: All scores and statistics courtesy of the Hobart Mercury, Launceston Examiner and North West Advocate publications.

1999
1999 in Australian rules football